The Farmers Bank Building is a historic commercial building at Main and Walnut Streets in Leslie, Arkansas.  It is a single-story brick structure, with its entrance angled at the street corner.  The main facade is three bays wide (including the angled entrance), all with round arches trimmed in limestone.  Built about 1910, this Romanesque Revival building house the Farmers Bank until it failed in the 1930s, and then the local post office for a time.

The building was listed on the National Register of Historic Places in 1993.

See also
National Register of Historic Places listings in Searcy County, Arkansas

References

Bank buildings on the National Register of Historic Places in Arkansas
Romanesque Revival architecture in Arkansas
Commercial buildings completed in 1910
Buildings and structures in Searcy County, Arkansas
National Register of Historic Places in Searcy County, Arkansas
Historic district contributing properties in Arkansas